Frank Robert Johnson (20 January 1943 – 15 December 2006) was an English journalist and editor.

Education
Johnson was born in London. He failed his 11-plus examination, and was educated at a state secondary school in Shoreditch in East London, which he left at the age of 16. Unlike many senior journalists of his time, he did not have a background in further or higher education, and instead, had taken a job as a 'messenger' on a national newspaper.

Career
He was a junior reporter at the North-West Evening Mail in Barrow-in-Furness from 1965 to 1966. One of the duties of news staff was to cover sport, which was an unwelcome intrusion into the weekend. Johnson once reported the score of a Barrow rugby league match inaccurately and was robustly criticised by his editor on the Monday morning. However, he never had to cover sport again. Later, Johnson wrote for the Nottingham Evening Post, the Liverpool Echo, The Sun, NOW!, and The Daily Telegraph, where he was a parliamentary sketch writer and leader writer.

He wrote for The Times as a parliamentary sketch writer, then as a foreign correspondent in Paris and Bonn, from 1981 to 1988, before moving to The Sunday Telegraph as a columnist and editor from 1988 to 1995. He was the editor of the conservative Spectator magazine from 1995 to 1999, before returning to The Daily Telegraph.

Personal life
He married Virginia Fraser, the widow of Simon Fraser, Master of Lovat, in 1998. He died from cancer in London on 15 December 2006.

References

1943 births
2006 deaths
20th-century British journalists
Deaths from cancer in England
English magazine editors
English male journalists
English newspaper editors
British foreign correspondents
Journalists from London
People from Shoreditch
The Daily Telegraph people
The Spectator editors
The Times journalists